Blackout States is the eighth solo studio album by Finnish rock singer Michael Monroe.

Singles
The first single, "Old King's Road", was released on 4 September 2015. On 10 February 2016, "Goin' Down with the Ship" was released as the second single.

Track listing

Personnel
Musicians
 Michael Monroe – lead vocals
 Steve Conte – guitars
 Rich Jones – guitars
 Sam Yaffa – bass
 Karl Rockfist – drums

Production
 Rich Jones - artwork
 Ville Juurikkala - photography
 Chips Kiesbye - producer
 Petri Majuri - mixing

References

2015 albums
Michael Monroe albums
Spinefarm Records albums